The Negro Rebellion, "Armed Uprising of the Independents of Color," also known as the Little Race War, the War of 1912, or The Twelve was a series of protests and uprisings in 1912 in Cuba, which saw conflict between Afro-Cuban rebels and the armed forces of Cuba. It took place mainly in the eastern region of the island where most Afro-Cubans were employed. After a weeks of fighting, including massacres of Afro-Cubans by the Cuban National Army led by General Jesus Monteagudo and a U.S. military intervention to protect American companies, the rebellion was put to an end. The leaders of Afro-Cuban rebels, Evaristo Estenoz and Pedro Ivonnet, were killed during the rebellion and their political movement, the Independent Party of Color was dissolved. Between 3,000 and 6,000 people were killed in the rebellion.

Background

Social conditions
Conditions in Cuba were poor for the black inhabitants, most of whom were employed in the sugarcane industry. Evaristo Estenoz led a movement to better these conditions which had begun in 1895 during the war for independence from Spain. Veterans of that war, primarily officers, organized the Independent Party of Color in 1908. Under the leadership of Estenoz, the party quickly gained the support of a large number of Afro-Cubans in opposition to Cuban President José Miguel Gómez. Gómez ordered the party disbanded under the Morúa law, which outlawed political parties based on race. By 1912 the Independent Party of Color had regrouped to stage another rebellion.

US Marines in Cuba
In early 1912, the United States government sent a detachment of 688 US Marines, officers and enlisted men, to Guantanamo Naval Base, while, Estenoz and his followers were preparing a rebellion. Though they were lightly armed, the rebels numbered several hundred men, mainly peasants.

History

Beginning
On 20 May, Estenoz and his men confronted the Cuban Army. Fighting took place mainly in Oriente Province, where most African Cubans lived, while there were also a few minor outbreaks of violence in the west, particularly in Las Villas Province. Initially the rebels were successful in engaging the Cuban forces, which included soldiers and militia. On 23 May, President Gómez requested aid from U.S. President William H. Taft, who sent additional marines. The first reinforcements arrived on 28 May, landing at Deer Point, Guantanamo Bay, to link up with Major Thorpe's battalion. Colonel Lincoln Karmany was in command of this new force, designated the 1st Provisional Regiment of Marines. It numbered 32 officers and 777 enlisted men.

Cuban official response
The Cuban government and press responded by demonizing the rebels with heavy racism. The Cuban President called on the Cuban people to fight for "civilization" against "ferocious savagery". The President also invoked the image of a "raped teacher" which turned out to be from a fake news story from a conservative newspaper. The conservative newspaper "El Dia" argued that Cuba should copy Jim Crow Laws in the United States where "blacks are mistreated and society is segregated" concluding that "dominated races do submit". Afro-Cuban politicians became worried and angered over the rise the racism during the rebellion. The racial demagoguery angered Juan Gualberto Gomez, former Cuban independence leader, such that he published a manifesto condemning it.

Arrival of United States forces
The 2nd Provisional Regiment of Marines with 1,292 officers and men under Colonel James E. Mahoney was also en route. Most arrived at Guantanamo Bay on 7 June, while one battalion was landed at Havana on 10 June. USS Mississippi landed her detachment at El Cuero on 19 June. Of the 1,292 men who landed at Guantanamo, only one battalion was deployed. Colonel Karmany took command of all the unassigned troops. Together, the American forces in Cuba totaled 2,789 officers and men and were organized into the 1st Provisional Marine Brigade. About half of them were sent to occupy towns and cities in eastern Cuba. The rest remained at the naval base. In June Estenoz rapidly began losing control of his territory to the Cuban military, which was dispersing large bands of the rebels and bystanders. Rebel forces had once numbered at least 3,000 men, but by June there were an estimated 1,800 left alive, although some sources cite 6,000 rebel deaths in total.

Suppression
The Marines were assigned to protect the American-owned sugarcane plantations and their associated properties, as well as copper mines, railroads and trains. The Afro-Cubans attacked the Marines only once, at El Cuero, but were repulsed without casualties on either side. President Gómez offered amnesty to any of the rebels who surrendered by 22 June, but Estenoz continued to fight with a few hundred men, though most of the rebels surrendered. By the end of June the majority had returned to their homes. Estenoz was killed by government forces who shot him in the back of the head at Miraca on 27 June.

Estenoz's death splintered the rebel army into small factions which were soon defeated. The most important faction was that of Pedro Ivonnet, who led his forces into the mountains to wage a guerrilla war, but he was driven out by the middle of July. Ivonnet surrendered on July 18, 1912, but was killed, reportedly while "trying to escape".

Aftermath
Following Ivonnet's surrender, Gómez announced that the American Marines were no longer needed and they began to withdraw, first to the naval base at Guantanamo and then to stations in the United States. The last Marines to leave Cuba embarked on the USS Prairie on 2 August. The Afro-Cubans suffered between 3,000 and 6,000 casualties, both combatants and non-combatants, and the results of the rebellion were disastrous. The Independent Party of Color was dissolved and conditions in Cuba remained unchanged.

References

Additional sources
 Aline Helg, Our Rightful Share: The Afro-Cuban Struggle for Equality, 1886–1912 ( University of North Carolina Press, 1995)
 Pérez Louis A., "Politics, Peasants, and People of Color: The 1912 “Race War” in Cuba Reconsidered", Hispanic American Historical Review, 66 (3),1986, 509–539. doi: https://doi.org/10.1215/00182168-66.3.509

Republic of Cuba (1902–1959)
Military history of the United States
Wars involving Cuba
Wars involving the United States
1912 in Cuba
Conflicts in 1912
Banana Wars
Cuba–United States relations
Massacres in Cuba
Mass murder in 1912
Protests in Cuba